Thysanoplusia sestertia  is a moth of the family Noctuidae. it is found in Africa, where it is known from Gabon, Kenya, South Africa and Uganda, as well as from Saudi Arabia and Yemen.

References

External links
Africanmoths: images & distribution map

Trichoplusia
Moths described in 1874
Moths of Africa
Moths of the Middle East